Grimsrud is a surname. Notable people with the surname include:

Beate Grimsrud (1963–2020), Norwegian writer
Lars Grimsrud, American aerospace engineer and performance automobile enthusiast
Lawrence Grimsrud (1871–1956), American lawyer and politician